Stickball is the third album by American saxophonist Charles Williams recorded in 1972 for the Mainstream label.

Track listing
 "Who Is He (And What Is He to You)?" (Bill Withers, Stan McKenny) - 3:33
 "People Make the World Go 'Round" (Thom Bell, Linda Creed) - 3:24
 "Where Is the Love" (Ralph MacDonald William Salter) - 2:44
 "Iron Jaws" (Ernie Wilkins) - 6:35
 "Drown in My Own Tears (Henry Glover) - 4:53
 "Ain't No Blues" (Charles Williams, Don Pullen) - 4:17
 "Just Before Day" (Tommy Dean) - 8:20
 "Willow Weep for Me" (Ann Ronell) - 6:33 Bonus track on CD reissue

Personnel 
Charles Williams - alto saxophone
Randy Brecker - flugelhorn
Chris Woods - alto saxophone, baritone saxophone
David "Bubba" Brooks - tenor saxophone
Frank Wess - tenor saxophone, flute
Don Pullen - organ
Paul Griffin - electric piano
Cornell Dupree, David Spinozza - electric guitar
Gordon Edwards - Fender Jazz bass
Clyde Lucas - drums
Ray Barretto - congas
David Carey - congas, marimba
String section arranged and conducted by Ernie Wilkins

References 

1972 albums
Charles Williams (musician) albums
Mainstream Records albums
Albums produced by Bob Shad